Darcy Rose Byrnes (born November 4, 1998) is an American and Irish actress, singer, and songwriter. She is best known for her roles as Abby Newman on The Young and the Restless and The Bold and the Beautiful, Penny Scavo on Desperate Housewives,  Princess Amber on Sofia the First and Elena and the Secret of Avalor, Ikki on The Legend of Korra, and Maricela in Spirit Riding Free. In addition to contributing original music to the show, Byrnes recurs in the role of Harper Schapira, in Season 1 and Season 2, on the Disney+ series Big Shot (2021/2022).

Early life
Byrnes was born in Burbank, California. She was homeschooled during her time on The Young and The Restless and then tested out of high school early. As she was too young to be a full time undergraduate student, she enrolled in the 8-week Shakespeare programme at the Royal Academy of Dramatic Art (RADA) in London.

Career 
Byrnes appeared in the direct-to-video film The Sparky Chronicles: The Map in 2003, the same year she obtained a role in the soap opera The Young and the Restless as Abby Newman from 2003 to 2008. During that time, she also had a guest starring role in The Bold and the Beautiful for 8 episodes. Byrnes also has appeared in television shows including How I Met Your Mother, Ghost Whisperer, Cold Case, Dirty Sexy Money, and House. She played Rebecca Knepp in the Hallmark television movie Amish Grace, alongside Kimberly Williams-Paisley. She played Penny Scavo in the ABC show Desperate Housewives. She also appeared in the movies Shark Swarm, Working Miracles, The Kidnapping, and A Thousand Words with Eddie Murphy.

Filmography

Awards and nominations 

 Sources

References

External links 
  
 Darcy Rose Byrnes on Instagram
  
 Darcy Rose Byrnes on Spotlight (UK)
 Darcy Rose Byrnes on Actors Access (US)

1998 births
21st-century American actresses
American child actresses
American people of Irish descent
American soap opera actresses
American television actresses
American voice actresses
American expatriates in the Republic of Ireland
American emigrants to Ireland
Irish expatriates in the United Kingdom
Citizens of Ireland through descent
Living people